Local Government Act (with its variations) is a stock short title used for legislation in Australia, Malaysia, New Zealand, Ireland and the United Kingdom, relating to local government.

The Bill for an Act with this short title may have been known as a Local Government Bill during its passage through Parliament.

Local Government Acts may be a generic name either for legislation bearing that short title or for all legislation which relates to local government.

List

Australia

New South Wales
Local Government Act 1993 (New South Wales)

Queensland
Local Government Act 1993 (Queensland)
Local Government Act 2009 (Queensland)

South Australia
Local Government Act 1934
Local Government (Forestry Reserves) Act 1944
Local Government Finance Authority Act 1983
Local Government Act 1999 (South Australia) 
Local Government (Elections) Act 1999
Local Government (Implementation) Act 1999

Tasmania
Local Government Act 1993 (Tasmania)

Victoria

Local Government Act 1874 No. 506. The first so-called.
Local Government Act 1890 No. 1112.
Local Government Act 1903 No. 1893.
Local Government Act 1915 No. 2686.
Local Government Act 1928 No. 3720
Local Government Act 1946 No. 5203.
Local Government Act 1958 No. 6299.
Local Government Act 1989 No. 11 of 1989. The current legislation

Many other acts entitled "Local Government Act" have been passed—as well as even more of the form "Local Government (Specific Matter) Act"—but these are the major ones which define the terms in which the others operate or alter. All but the last have had the long titles "An act to consolidate the Law(s) relating to Local Government". Additional acts concerning local government in the early days of the colony did not have short titles.

Western Australia
Local Government Act 1995

Canada

British Columbia
Local Government Act

Malaysia
The Local Government Act 1976

New Zealand
The Local Government Act 1974
The Local Government Act 2002
The Local Government (Rating) Act 2002
The Local Government Official Information and Meetings Act 1987
(and others starting with the same two words)

Ireland
The Local Government Act 1925
The Local Government Act 1927
The Local Government Act 1931
The Local Government Act 1933
The Local Government Act 1936
The Local Government Act 1941
The Local Government Act 1955
The Local Government (Reorganisation) Act 1985
The Local Government Act 1991
The Local Government Act 1994
The Local Government Act 1998
The Local Government Act 2000
The Local Government Act 2001
The Local Government Reform Act 2014
The Local Government Act 2019

United Kingdom

Parliament of the United Kingdom

The following list of Acts passed by the Parliament of the United Kingdom only includes Public General Acts, and so does not include any of the numerous "Provisional Order Confirmation Acts"

Parliament of Northern Ireland
The Local Government (Emergency Powers) Act (Northern Ireland) 1921
The Local Government Act (Northern Ireland) 1922
The Local Government Act (Northern Ireland) 1969
The Local Government (Boundaries) Act (Northern Ireland) 1971
The Local Government Act (Northern Ireland) 1972

Northern Ireland Assembly
The Local Government (Best Value) Act (Northern Ireland) 2002

Scottish Parliament
The Scottish Local Government (Elections) Act 2002
The Local Government in Scotland Act 2003
The Local Governance (Scotland) Act 2004

See also
List of short titles

Lists of legislation by short title